MFK Vrbové is a Slovak football team, based in the town of Vrbové. The club was founded in 1922.

External links 

 

Vrbove
Association football clubs established in 1922
1922 establishments in Slovakia